This was the first edition of the event.

Ashleigh Barty won the title, defeating Dayana Yastremska in the final, 6–2, 7–5.

Seeds
The top two seeds received a bye into the second round.

Draw

Finals

Top half

Bottom half

Qualifying

Seeds

Qualifiers

Lucky losers

Qualifying draw

First qualifier

Second qualifier

Third qualifier

Fourth qualifier

Fifth qualifier

Sixth qualifier

References

External links
 Main & Qualifying Draw in WTA website (archived)
 Main Draw
 Qualifying Draw

2020 WTA Tour
2020 Women's Singles
2020 in Australian tennis
January 2020 sports events in Australia